The Newspaper Reader is an outdoor 1978 sculpture by John Seward Johnson II, installed along Pacific Avenue in Forest Grove, Oregon, United States. The bronze sculpture depicts a man sitting on a bench and reading a newspaper. It measures approximately 4.5 x 2.5 x 2.5 ft, and rests on a concrete base which measures approximately 2.5 x 5.5 x 1.5 ft. The artwork was surveyed by the Smithsonian Institution's "Save Outdoor Sculpture!" program in 1994.

See also

 1978 in art

References

1978 sculptures
Bronze sculptures in Oregon
Buildings and structures in Forest Grove, Oregon
Outdoor sculptures in Oregon
Sculptures by John Seward Johnson II
Sculptures of men in Oregon
Statues in Oregon